Underhill may refer to:

Places
Underhill, a community within the village of Blackville, New Brunswick, Canada
Underhill, Dorset, England
Underhill Stadium, Barnet, England, the former home ground of Barnet F.C.
Underhill, Vermont, United States
Underhill, Wisconsin, United States
Underhill (community), Wisconsin. an unincorporated community, United States
Underhill, Low Fell, Gateshead, First House in the world to be lit by Electric light.
Underhill, Wolverhampton, a housing estate in North-east Wolverhampton also known as the Scotlands Estate.

Fiction
Underhill, the name of the first settlement on Mars in the novel Red Mars by Kim Stanley Robinson
Underhill, fictional character in the short story The Rule of Names by Ursula K. Le Guin
Underhill, an alternate reality inhabited by any multitude of fantasy creatures in Mercedes Lackey's urban fantasy novels
Sherkaner Underhill, fictional non-human character in the novel A Deepness in the Sky by Vernor Vinge
Underhill, Ted, fictional character in the movie Fletch
Underhill, Mr., The name Gandalf gave Frodo Baggins to travel under when he left Hobbiton in The Fellowship of the Ring by J.R.R. Tolkien

Other
Underhill (surname), notable people named Underhill
, a ship of the U.S. Navy